Yuri Georgievich Skobov (born 13 March 1949) was a Soviet/Russian cross-country skier who competed in the early 1970s, training at Spartak in Omutninsk. He won the 4 x 10 km gold at the 1972 Winter Olympics in Sapporo for the USSR. Skobov also finished 5th in the 15 km event at those same games.

He also won a silver medal in the 4 x 10 km relay at the 1974 FIS Nordic World Ski Championships in Falun.

References

External links
 
 
 

1949 births
Living people
Olympic cross-country skiers of the Soviet Union
Soviet male cross-country skiers
Russian male cross-country skiers
Cross-country skiers at the 1972 Winter Olympics
Cross-country skiers at the 1976 Winter Olympics
Spartak athletes
Olympic gold medalists for the Soviet Union
Olympic medalists in cross-country skiing
FIS Nordic World Ski Championships medalists in cross-country skiing
Medalists at the 1972 Winter Olympics